Covent Garden is a street in Cambridge, England, off Mill Road and near The Kite district.
The street takes its name from the London market of the same name as there used to be a market garden there.

The street has one pub The Six Bells, where cricketer Israel Haggis was landlord from 1837 to 1844.

Blue plaques
Blue plaques have been created for each of the 44 houses, recording highlights of the residents' history such as the tailor, Frederick Scriven, who lived at number 9 for 47 years and whose assistant was hanged for murder in 1876.

References

Streets in Cambridge
Blue plaques